The German mathematician Bernhard Riemann (1826–1866) is the eponym of many things.

"Riemann" (by field)
Riemann bilinear relations
Riemann conditions
Riemann form
Riemann function
Riemann–Hurwitz formula
Riemann matrix
Riemann operator
Riemann singularity theorem
Riemann-Kempf singularity theorem
Riemann surface
Compact Riemann surface
Planar Riemann surface
Cauchy–Riemann manifold
The tangential Cauchy–Riemann complex
Zariski–Riemann space

Analysis
Cauchy–Riemann equations
Riemann integral
Generalized Riemann integral
Riemann multiple integral
Riemann invariant
Riemann mapping theorem
Measurable Riemann mapping theorem
Riemann problem
Riemann solver
Riemann sphere
Riemann–Hilbert correspondence
Riemann–Hilbert problem
Riemann–Lebesgue lemma
Riemann–Liouville integral
Riemann–Roch theorem
Arithmetic Riemann–Roch theorem
Riemann–Roch theorem for smooth manifolds
Riemann–Roch theorem for surfaces
Grothendieck–Hirzebruch–Riemann–Roch theorem
Hirzebruch–Riemann–Roch theorem
Riemann–Stieltjes integral
Riemann series theorem
Riemann sum

Number theory
Riemann–von Mangoldt formula
Riemann hypothesis
Generalized Riemann hypothesis
Grand Riemann hypothesis
Riemann hypothesis for curves over finite fields
Riemann theta function
Riemann Xi function
Riemann zeta function
Riemann–Siegel formula
Riemann–Siegel theta function

Physics
Free Riemann gas also called primon gas
Riemann invariant
Riemann–Cartan geometry
Riemann–Silberstein vector
Riemann-Lebovitz formulation
Riemann curvature tensor also called Riemann tensor
Riemann tensor (general relativity)

Riemannian 

Pseudo-Riemannian manifold
Riemannian bundle metric
Riemannian circle
Riemannian cobordism
Riemannian connection
Riemannian connection on a surface
Riemannian cubic
Riemannian cubic polynomials
Riemannian foliation
Riemannian geometry
Fundamental theorem of Riemannian geometry
Riemannian graph
Riemannian group
Riemannian holonomy
Riemannian manifold also called Riemannian space
Riemannian metric tensor
Riemannian Penrose inequality
Riemannian polyhedron
Riemannian singular value decomposition
Riemannian submanifold
Riemannian submersion
Riemannian volume form
Riemannian wavefield extrapolation
Sub-Riemannian manifold
Riemannian symmetric space

Riemann's 
Riemann's differential equation
Riemann's existence theorem
Riemann's explicit formula
Riemann's minimal surface
Riemann's theorem on removable singularities

Non-mathematical 
Free Riemann gas
Riemann (crater)
4167 Riemann

Riemann
Bernhard Riemann